Ketti Melam is a 1985 Indian Tamil-language film written and directed by Visu. The film stars Karthik and Sulakshana. It was released on 11 October 1985, and failed commercially.

Plot

Cast 
Karthik
Sulakshana
Visu
Prameela
Disco Shanti
Manorama
 Ravichandran
 Sivachandran
Kishmu

Soundtrack 
The music was composed by Ilaiyaraaja.

Reception 
Kalki praised Ravichandran's performance while calling Visu's humour as okay and concluded there is laughter here, there is tears, there is fight, there are listenable songs.

References

External links 
 

1980s Tamil-language films
1985 films
Films directed by Visu
Films scored by Ilaiyaraaja
Films with screenplays by Visu